Roman Frydman is an American, Polish born economist at New York University and the author of more than ten books treating macroeconomic theory and privatization.

Frydman's research, exemplified by his two recent books with Michael D. Goldberg, Imperfect Knowledge Economics: Exchange Rates and Risk (Princeton University Press, 2007) and Beyond Mechanical Markets: Asset Price, Swings, Risk, and the Role of the State (Princeton University Press, 2011), argues that markets cannot be predicted accurately by deterministic optimization models, particularly models promoted by adherents of the rational expectations hypothesis.  Rather, Frydman argues that predictive models must take into account the role of contingent events, irrationality, imperfect knowledge and communication among the market participants.  "Imperfect Knowledge Economics" presents a model that many critics have described as not only more flexible, but also more predictive of empirical events.

Frydman left Poland in 1968, after antisemitic campaign of Polish March. He did his undergraduate studies in physics and mathematics at Cooper Union, graduating in 1971. After earning a master's degree in mathematics and computer science from New York University in 1973, he began studying economics at Columbia University, receiving a second master's degree in 1976 and a Ph.D. in 1978. After working in central Europe for many years, he returned to NYU as a faculty member in 1995. In 2001 he founded the Center on Capitalism & Society at Columbia with his frequent collaborator, Nobel Memorial Prize winner Edmund Phelps.

References

External links 
 

1948 births
Living people
Polish emigrants to the United States
20th-century Polish Jews
Macroeconomists
Cooper Union alumni
New York University alumni
Columbia Graduate School of Arts and Sciences alumni
New York University faculty
20th-century American economists
21st-century American economists
Institute for New Economic Thinking